Taivaleria is a genus of moths of the family Noctuidae.

Species
 Taivaleria rubrifasciata Hreblay & Ronkay, 2000

References
Natural History Museum Lepidoptera genus database
Taivaleria at funet

Cuculliinae